83 (eighty-three)  is the natural number following 82 and preceding 84.

In mathematics
83 is:

 the sum of three consecutive primes (23 + 29 + 31).
 the sum of five consecutive primes (11 + 13 + 17 + 19 + 23).
 the 23rd prime number, following 79 (of which it is also a cousin prime) and preceding 89.
 a Sophie Germain prime.
 a safe prime.
 a Chen prime.
 an Eisenstein prime with no imaginary part and real part of the form 3n − 1.
 a highly cototient number.
 there number of primes that are right-truncatable.
 a super-prime, because 23 is prime.

In science

Chemistry
The atomic number of bismuth (Bi)

Astronomy
Messier object M83, a magnitude 8.5 spiral galaxy in the constellation Hydra, also known as the Southern Pinwheel Galaxy
The New General Catalogue object NGC 83, a magnitude 12.3 elliptical galaxy in the constellation Andromeda

In religion

Judaism
 When someone reaches 83 they may celebrate a second bar mitzvah

In music
 M83 is the debut album of the French electronic music group M83
 83 is a song written by John Mayer in the Room for Squares album.
 83 is a Quebec hip-hop group
 83 is a song produced by Maximono

In film and television
 Gypsy 83 is 2001 film directed by Todd Stephens
 Class of '83 is 2004 film directed by Kurt E. Soderling
 83 Hours 'Til Dawn is a 1990 film directed by Donald Wrye
 83 is the highest UHF channel on older televisions made before the late 1970s (newer televisions only go up to channel 69, due to the frequency spectrum previously assigned to channels 70–83 in the United States being reassigned to cellular phone service there in the late 1970s-early 1980s). As an example, the television station CIVIC-TV managed by the James Woods character Max Renn in the 1983 film Videodrome was on Channel 83.

In other fields

Eighty-three is also:
 The year AD 83, 83 BC, or 1983
 The TI-83 series, graphing calculators from Texas Instruments
 Konsept83 is a Greek graphic design team.
 The model number of Bell XP-83
 The number of the French department Var
 The ISBN Group Identifier for books published in Poland
 The eighth letter of the alphabet is H and the third letter is C, thus 83 stands for "Heil Christ," a greeting sometimes (not always) used by racist organizations that consider themselves also to be Christian. This symbology is also known to be used by many non-racist Christians and non-denominational Churches.
 An emoticon based on :3 with wide-open eyes.

References

Integers